Andrew Krivák is an American novelist. His debut novel, The Sojourn (2011) was nominated for the National Book Award for Fiction, won the Dayton Literary Peace Prize, and was well received critically. He also wrote a memoir about his time in the Jesuit order, A Long Retreat: In Search of a Religious Life (2008). He is a graduate of St. John's College in Annapolis, as well as the writing program at Columbia University. He also holds a Ph.D. from Rutgers University.

Books
 A Long Retreat: In Search of a Religious Life (memoir, 2008)
 The Sojourn (novel, 2011)
 The Signal Flame (novel, 2017)
 The Bear (novel, 2020)

References

External links
Official website

21st-century American novelists
Living people
American male novelists
21st-century American male writers
Year of birth missing (living people)